Cerebral Fix are an English thrash metal band formed in Birmingham in 1986. They became members of the UK thrash metal and death metal scenes through four albums, three of which were on major labels before finally disbanding in 1993. In 2006, the band announced its reformation. Drummer Neil Farrington died in the early hours of 20 December, 2009.

Current members
 Neil Hadden – vocals
 Gregg Fellows – guitar
 Tony Warburton – guitar
 Chris 'Doss' Hatton - guitar
 Nigel Joiner - bass
 Andy Baker – drums

Former members
 Frank Healy – bass
 Paul Adams – bass
 Steve Watson - bass / guitar
 Jake Morgan – bass (temporary)
 Kev Frost – drums
 Adrian Jones – drums
 Nicholas Barker – drums (temporary)
 Mark Culley - bass (temporary)
 Neil Farrington (deceased) – drums
 Scott Fairfax-bass (temporary)
 Simon Forrest – vocals

Discography
We Need Therapy (1987) Demo
Product of Disgust (1987) Demo
Life Sucks... And Then You Die! (1988) Vinyl Solution
Tower of Spite (1990) Demo	
Tower of Spite (1990) Roadrunner Records
Bastards (1991) Roadrunner Records
Death Erotica (1992) Music For Nations/Under One Flag
Disaster of Reality (2016) Xtreem Music

References

External links
 
 Encyclopaedia Metallum band entry

English death metal musical groups
English thrash metal musical groups
Musical groups from Birmingham, West Midlands
Musical groups established in 1986
Musical groups disestablished in 1993
Musical groups reestablished in 2006
Musical quintets
1986 establishments in England